is a railway station in the city of Fukushima, Fukushima Prefecture, Japan operated by Fukushima Kōtsū.

Lines
Iohji-mae Station is served by the Iizaka Line and is located 7.4 km from the starting point of the line at

Station layout
Iohji-mae Station has one side platform serving a single bi-directional track. It is staffed in the morning and evening. There is also a bicycle parking area situated behind the station.

Adjacent stations

History
It was renamed to its present name on November 20, 1926.

Surrounding area
Io-ji

See also
 List of railway stations in Japan

External links

  

Railway stations in Japan opened in 1924
Railway stations in Fukushima Prefecture
Fukushima Kōtsū Iizaka Line
Fukushima (city)